The Forest River State Bank, at 110 Front Street in Forest River, Walsh County, North Dakota, was listed on the National Register of Historic Places in 2019.

It is a one-story brick building.

References

External links

Bank buildings on the National Register of Historic Places in North Dakota
National Register of Historic Places in Walsh County, North Dakota